Lucien Sebag (1933, Tunis – 1965, Paris) was a French Marxist anthropologist, a student of Claude Lévi-Strauss.

A researcher at the Centre national de la recherche scientifique, he became known for trying to reconcile structuralism and marxism in a book precisely  entitled Marxisme et structuralisme (1964). Of suicidal temperament, he was followed by the psychoanalyst Jacques Lacan. In 1965, he committed suicide after falling in love with Judith, the daughter of Lacan.

Publications 
1964: Marxisme et structuralisme, Paris, Payot
1971: L'Invention du monde chez les Indiens Pueblos, introduction by Jacqueline Bolens, Paris, (posthumous)
1977: Les Ayoré du Chaco septentrional. Étude critique à partir des notes de Lucien Sebag, by Carmen Bernand-Munoz

Bibliography 
 Dossier, directed by Salvatore D'Onofrio, devoted to Lucien Sebag in the journal Gradhiva, Paris, fascicule no 2, 2005. Texts by Salvatore D'Onofrio, Pierre Clastres, Violeta and Enrique Bruchegger, etc.

External links 
 Autour de Lucien Sebag on Gradhiva
 Lucian Sebag: Marxisme et structuralisme (compte rendu) on Persée
 Lucien Sebag: Le chamanisme ayoréo (article) on Persée
 [%22FR_751052331_FLS_e0000011%22,true,%22%22 Fonds Lucien Sebag on the site of the Collège de France

People from Tunis
1933 births
1965 suicides
French anthropologists
Marxist theorists
Tunisian Jews
20th-century anthropologists
Suicides in France